Jamesie Donnelly is a hurler. He plays for Seán MacCumhaills and, formerly, the Donegal county team.

He won the 2011 Lory Meagher Cup with his county, starting and completing the final.

He won the 2013 Nicky Rackard Cup, starting and completing the final. He also won the 2018 Nicky Rackard Cup, starting the final before being substituted at half-time.

He retired from inter-county hurling in 2018.

Donnelly was part of the county management team in 2021, but had left this role by early 2022.

Married to Claire, he is from Ballybofey. The couple have several children. Their third child, a daughter, died of triploid syndrome in February 2018.

References

Year of birth missing (living people)
Living people
Donegal inter-county hurlers
People from Ballybofey
Seán MacCumhaills hurlers